Pluto is a fictional deity appearing in American comic books published by Marvel Comics. The character is based on the Greco-Roman god of the same name.

Publication history

Pluto first appeared in the pages of Thor #127 in 1966 where he was adapted by Stan Lee and drawn by Jack Kirby.

Fictional character biography
Pluto is the Olympian god of the Underworld, death, and the dead, and is the Monarch of Hades. Much of the character's story parallels that of traditional Greek Myth. To wit, after defeating their father Cronus, Pluto and his brothers Zeus and Neptune as well as his sisters Hera, Hestia and Demeter drew lots to divide Cronus' empire among them. Pluto gained control of the Underworld as the judge of the dead. However, in the Marvel Universe, Pluto is a scheming god that plans to overthrow Zeus, which no Greek Myth supports.

His most infamous act is when he takes Zeus' and Demeter's daughter, his niece Persephone (also known as Kore) as his wife against her will. This event goes on to cause him some dismal failures in the future; for instance the Avengers once defeat him when Persephone issues an edict against him. He also became a major enemy of Hercules, when the young Hercules captures Pluto's dog Cerberus as one of his Twelve Labours.

When worship of the Greek Gods dies out, Zeus forbids Pluto to take anymore souls into his underworld. He became bitter and begins a long history of plotting against his more powerful brother. After numerous failures, Zeus decrees that Pluto can only leave the Underworld if he finds someone willing to rule in his place. Pluto travels to Earth and disguises himself as Mr. Hellman, a film producer, and invites Hercules to make a film about himself. Hercules signs the contract into ruling the underworld unaware of that the contract actually binds him to serve as ruler of the Olympian Underworld in Pluto's place, as he believes the film is about him conquering the Netherworld by defeating Pluto. Thor learns of Pluto's deception and challenges him on Hercules' behalf. Pluto sends Thor into the Olympian Underworld where his goal is to defeat Pluto's minions. After witnessing Thor's remarkable progress which destroys much of the Underworld which Pluto has spent centuries building, Pluto becomes disgusted and destroys the contract, releasing Hercules. Pluto next invaded Earth with mutates from an alternate future. He clashed with Thor, and was thwarted by Zeus.

Pluto attempts to invade both Olympus, home of the Greek Gods and Asgard, home of Thor and his fellow Asgardians on numerous occasions, each without success. Pluto forms an alliance with Ares, his nephew and Olympian God of War, and attempts to foment war between Olympus and Asgard, but is defeated in combat by Thor. Pluto eventually makes an alliance with other death gods and demons. He allies himself with Queen Hippolyte, Queen of the Amazons, and Ares, who also believes that Zeus refusal to force the humans to worship them is a mistake. However Hippolyte only wants Hercules to be hers and has no interest in Pluto's desire to be worshipped by humanity again. Pluto attempts to sponsor the divorce of Hercules and Hebe to marry Hercules to Hippolyte as well as Ares to marry Venus.  According to Olympian law, Hercules and Venus are not allowed to fight their partners when Hippolyte and Ares assist Pluto in conquering Olympus. However, this plan was exposed by Ghost Rider, and ultimately fails as Zeus, after some hesitation at first, finally forbids the unions.

Pluto later allied with Ulik and Loki against Thor. Pluto sought to create a "nether-hole" that would destroy the universe. He fought and defeated the Stranger, but was defeated by the Thing and the Hulk, whom the Stranger had brought with him. Pluto allied in a scheme with other death gods and demons. He was devoured by Demogorge, but released by Thor. Pluto later held the Avengers prisoner in Tartarus at Zeus's behest, but the Avengers battled their way out and escaped.

To circumvent Zeus' decree, Pluto attempts to conquer Earth with the help of Lorelei. Pluto transforms Lorelei into a copy of the Valkyrie and drains her of her power and memories. He then uses the absorbed power to take control of the real Valkyrie to turn Earth into a realm of the dead itself. The Valkyrie's presence masks his own influence and Zeus' decree still allows Pluto to annex other realms of the dead. Pluto is eventually stopped by the Defenders who bring Lorelei along, thinking her to be their teammate. The clash of the two Valkyries releases Lorelei from the spell and together they turned on Pluto and ended his plan.

With the disappearance of the Asgardians after Ragnarök, Zeus fears for the continued existence of the Olympians as well and decides that they should mingle among humanity to hide from any force threatening them. Hades (Pluto) becomes a mafia-inspired crime lord, joking that he is still a lord of the underworld. The Olympians eventually return to Olympus, where they come under siege by the Japanese god Amatsu-Mikaboshi.

The Olympus Group
Hera and Pluto take over the Olympus Group, the modern day seat of power for the Olympians, through the shares inherited by Hera from Zeus and by buying out Poseidon. They declare the company has a new major goal: the deaths of Athena and Hercules. Pluto appears with the Olympus Group when Norman Osborn's Avengers storm one of the Group's warehouses. There, Pluto grants Daken an unsolicited prophecy of the day, month, and gruesomeness of Daken's death. Daken attacks Pluto to little effect, and is in turn overwhelmed by Pluto's army of mafioso undead.

Hercules and Amadeus Cho enter Pluto's underworld, its new entrance being an Atlantic City casino where deceased heroes and villains can try betting their way into resurrection. There, they find Pluto has begun a trial with Zeus as the accused, ostensibly in the name of all his victims in Hades, with 501 deceased jurors holding court in a mockery of Athenian justice. Pluto hopes that removing Zeus will increase his own power within the pact made in prehistory among Pluto, Poseidon and Zeus to divide creation into their respective realms. He tries to prevent Hercules from interfering by offering him the soul of Hercules' adoptive father, who tells Hercules to rescue Zeus instead. Zeus is eventually found guilty, and submits to his sentence: he drinks from the Lethe river, erasing his memory, and is reborn on Earth as a child. With Zeus removed from their clutches, the dead turn against Pluto immediately, as he is now the sole accessible cause of their suffering.

Pluto subsequently reappears at Hercules' funeral, in the company of Athena (now the leader of the Olympians), Apollo, Poseidon, and Hebe.

During the Chaos War storyline, Pluto is seen arguing with Persephone when Hela appears telling him that the realms of the dead are being targeted by Amatsu-Mikaboshi. Pluto releases the souls of the dead, both blessed and damned, to fight for his realm, freeing Zeus, Hera, Ares, various mortal heroes (including Banshee, Swordsman I, and Yellowjacket II) and various mortal villains (including Abomination and Iron Monger).

Powers and abilities
Pluto is a member of the race of immortals known as the gods of Olympus. Among his race, his superhuman strength is equaled only by Neptune and Ares, and is exceeded only by Zeus and Hercules. Pluto's body is also virtually tireless, granting him almost limitless stamina. Pluto has proven capable of withstanding powerful impact forces, temperature extremes, and powerful energy blasts all without sustaining damage. Like all other members of his race, Pluto is immortal in the sense that he is immune to the effects of aging. He has not aged since reaching adulthood and is also immune to all known diseases. It would take damage that severely discorporated his body to cause his physical death. He is able to recover from damage with a greater speed and extent than most other members of his race.

Pluto controls vast magical powers, equaled only by Neptune, and second only to Zeus amongst Olympians, and has faced Earth's Sorcerer Supreme, Doctor Strange, in direct magical combat. Pluto can generate powerful energy blasts; temporarily increase his physical attributes; bestow superhuman powers upon other beings or objects; manipulate time on a considerable scale, from simply accessing other eras (including alternate futures) or creating impenetrable time funnels; create highly durable force fields; create weapons of mystical flame, whose touch can paralyze and harm an opponent, even gods such as Hercules, and is capable of interdimensional teleportation.

As a Death God, Pluto has a pact with Death that allows him to claim the souls of any worshipper of the Greco-Roman Gods, and order those under his command. He is capable of draining the energy and life-force from those that he touches, even other gods. The various Death Gods can either act as allies or competitors depending on the situation.  Pluto is more powerful within Hades than in other realms, due to his ability to commune with and manipulate the energies of the Underworld. On Earth, he can command armies of undead.

Although he typically prefers to use minions, Pluto is a formidable hand-to-hand combatant, skilled in the use of battleaxes and swords made of the enchanted, virtually indestructible, "adamantine" (from which the fictional metal, adamantium, was named), and can use them to channel his powers. He wears Olympian battle armor made of the same material.

Pluto possesses a helmet that renders him invisible and undetectable, even to fellow gods; he sometimes rides a mystical chariot capable of flight and travelling to other realms, and he has made occasional use of potent mystical items such as the Gem of Tartarus, which encased the four original Defenders within an enchanted pillar, though the Gem itself was fragile and swiftly shattered.

Reception
 In 2019, CBR.com ranked Hades 8th in their "Marvel Comics: The 10 Most Powerful Olympians" list.
 In 2021, CBR.com ranked Hades 4th in their "Marvel: 10 Most Powerful Olympians" list.
 In 2022, Sportskeeda ranked Hades 7th in their "10 best Greek gods from Marvel comics " list.
 In 2022, Screen Rant included Pluto in their "10 Most Powerful Olympian Gods In Marvel Comics" list.

In other media

Television
 Pluto appears in The Mighty Thor portion of The Marvel Super Heroes animated television series from the 1960s.
 Pluto appear in the Hulk and the Agents of S.M.A.S.H. episode "The Tale of Hercules", voiced by Robert Englund. He steals the Shield of Minerva from Hercules' vault in order to turn people to stone and is served by an army of Harpies and Minotaurs. In the battle against Hercules, he turns him to stone, but with the cunning of the Hulk, he destroys the shield and is defeated, but retreats telling the Hulk that he will soon drag his soul into the underworld.

References

External links
 Pluto at Marvel.com
 
 

Characters created by Jack Kirby
Characters created by Stan Lee
Comics characters introduced in 1966
Fictional characters with superhuman durability or invulnerability
Fictional gods
Classical mythology in Marvel Comics
Greek and Roman deities in fiction
Marvel Comics characters with accelerated healing
Marvel Comics characters with superhuman strength
Marvel Comics supervillains